Baulkham Hills  is a suburb in the Hills District of Greater Sydney, in the state of New South Wales, Australia. It is 30 kilometres north-west of the Sydney central business district within the local government area of The Hills Shire. Baulkham Hills is the administrative seat of The Hills Shire, an outer metropolitan shire within Greater Sydney. The suburb is also the most populous within the Hills Shire. It is known colloquially as "Baulko". Baulkham Hill’s Norwest Business Park is home to several Fortune 500 companies, a number of shopping centres, high-rise buildings, and industrial and recreational spaces.

Geography
Baulkham Hills is predominately a residential suburb of the Hills District, with Norwest Business Park in the northern part of the suburb. Baulkham Hills Junction is the intersection of three major roads; Windsor Road, Old Northern Road, and Seven Hills Road. It is also bound by Old Windsor Road and the North-West T-way in the west; and the Hills Motorway in the south, forming part of the National Highway.

History
The land that is now called Baulkham Hills was originally home to the Bidjigal people, who are believed to be a clan of the Darug people, who occupied all the land to the immediate west of Sydney. The best-known Aboriginal person from that time is Pemulwuy, a Bidjigal leader who led the Indigenous resistance movement against the British forces, including sacking farms in Castle Hill, before his eventual capture and execution by the British militia.

The first European settler in the Baulkham Hills Shire was William Joyce, who arrived in Australia in October, 1791. In December, 1794, he was given a grant of 30 acres (121,000 m2) in what became Baulkham Hills. He built a farmhouse on this land, but it was damaged by a fire in 1804,  so he rebuilt it. The house still stands; however, it is now on a 2,055 m2 property which backs onto Old Windsor Road. The suburb was largely made up of land grants until the mid 19th century, when many of these started to be subdivided into farms. This was accelerated by the construction of the Rogans Hill Railway Line. Urban developments were expedited from the 1960s. The name Baulkham Hills was given to the area by Andrew McDougall, a settler from Buckholm Hills, County of Roxburgh, Scotland. The name, which reminded McDougall of his homeland, was officially recognised in 1802. Baulkham Hills Post Office opened on 1 April 1856.

On 29 June 2018, a small portion of the Baulkham Hills suburb was proclaimed as part of the new suburb of Norwest.

Heritage listings 
Baulkham Hills has a number of heritage-listed sites, including:
 Seven Hills Road, Bella Vista: Pearce Family Cemetery

Demographics
The most common countries of birth were China 6.9%, India 4.8%, England 2.7%, South Korea 2.0% and Sri Lanka 1.6%. 61.8% of residents spoke only English at home. Other languages spoken at home included Mandarin 8.3%, Cantonese 4.1%, Korean 2.6%, Hindi 2.3% and Tamil 1.6%. The most common responses for religious affiliation were Catholic 26.6%, No Religion 23.6%, Anglican 14.2% and Hinduism 5.7%.

Transport

The bulk of Baulkham Hills residents own private vehicles and travel to work using these, however bus services and the new Sydney Metro North West line services the suburb. 

At the intersection known as Baulkham Hills Junction several major roads meet including: Seven Hills Road, Old Northern Road and Windsor Road. The fastest route from the Sydney CBD is via the M2 Hills Motorway, exiting at Windsor Road.

Baulkham Hills is serviced by the Hillsbus bus company, which provides services to the nearby commercial centres of Castle Hill, Parramatta and frequent services to the Sydney CBD. Hillsbus provides services to the City via routes 610/610X which cover the previous route M61, 614X and 615X. The 610/610X services can also be caught in the westbound direction serving Kellyville. Services are also provided to St. Leonards, Milsons Point and North Sydney, through route 612X.

Route 600 provides a high-frequency service to the areas around Parramatta, Pennant Hills and Hornsby.

In the past, there was the Rogans Hill line, connecting the suburb to Parramatta. Railway Street near Baulkham Hills Junction is a reminder of this. It was closed down in 1930 due to traffic problems on Windsor Road and large financial losses. Land owned by the rail authority was sold to the Hills Bowling Club in the mid-1970s to build their two front bowling greens.

Commercial area
 Grove Square is a shopping centre, located on the intersection of Windsor Road and Old Northern Road. It features supermarkets operated by Coles, Woolworths, and Aldi plus 70 specialty shops. A redevelopment was completed in 2008 to significantly expand the floor space of the centre.

In the northern part of the suburb, there is another shopping centre called Norwest Marketown, together with many other businesses. The Norwest Business Park located nearby is partially in Baulkham Hills and Bella Vista.

Hospital
The Hills Private Hospital on Windsor Road (near the corner of Merindah Road) was redeveloped into a rehabilitation and mental health hospital, after the previous hospital's owners, Healthscope, moved its operations to the nearby Norwest Business Park. The hospital includes a 92-bed rehabilitation unit and a 19-bed mental health unit, providing both inpatient and day program services.

Parks and reserves
Baulkham Hills features a number of parks and reserves, such as the Bidjigal Reserve (previously known as Excelsior Reserve), with native fauna such as koala, swamp wallaby, echidna, and eastern water dragon. Smaller reserves include the Sophia Doyle reserve and the Crestwood Reserve, which are habitat to brushtail and ringtail possums and a wide range of birds and lizards.

The Baulkham Hills Shire Bushland Conservation Committee is a voluntary committee of Council that assists with the management of the Shire's bushland.

Schools
 Matthew Pearce Public School
 Crestwood High School
 Crestwood Public School
 Baulkham Hills High School
 Model Farms High School
 Baulkham Hills North Public School
 Jasper Road Public School
 St. Michael's Primary School
 Our Lady of Lourdes Primary School
Baulkham Hills High School also has an Army Cadet Unit, which is open only to students at Baulkham Hills High School.

Places of worship
Baulkham Hills has some 15 places of worship belonging to various Christian denominations including:
 St. Michaels Catholic Church
 Our Lady of Lourdes Catholic Church
 Holy Trinity Anglican Church
 Crossway Anglican Church
 St Matthews Uniting Church
 The headquarters of Hillsong
 Norwest Anglican Church (Chapel Lane is the evening congregation)
 Africa Inland Mission International

A Baha'i Spiritual Assembly is also located in the suburb.

Culture
Baulkham Hills has a public library. It does not have a theatre or a cinema; although these are found in the adjacent suburb of Castle Hill where many residents make use of them. The regions community radio station, Alive 90.5, broadcasts from studios and a transmission tower in the suburb.

Events
The annual Orange Blossom Festival is held in Baulkham Hills Shire each September. The HYPE Festival is held every April during National Youth Week and again in September during the Orange Blossom festival and attracts large crowds of youths each year. It has featured high-profile Australian music acts such as Gerling, Something With Numbers, Parkway Drive, and The Getaway Plan.

Notable residents
 Doug Bollinger, Australian cricketer
 Tom Burton, Sailor and Olympic Gold Medalist
 Dave Evans, Australian Radio/TV Personality (Triple M / Fox Sports)
 Delta Goodrem, pop singer and actress.
 Denise Hofman, co-author of "Forever Nine'', a study of Michael Guider
 Dave Jones, YouTube Engineering Video Blogger
 Nick Phipps rugby union professional
 Jana Pittman, Australian Olympic athlete
 Mitchell Starc, Australian cricketer
 Ray Warren, TV personality and football commentator
 Matt Castley, Australian TV Actor

References

External links

 Baulkham Hills Shire Council
 History of Baulkham Hills Shire
 Orange Blossom Festival
 Matthew Pearce Public School
 Baulkham Hills High School
 Crestwood High School
 Crestwood Public School
 Model Farms High School
 Baulkham Hills North Public School
 Jasper Road Public School
 St. Michael's Primary School
 Our Lady of Lourdes Primary School

 
Suburbs of Sydney
The Hills Shire
City of Parramatta
Populated places established in 1794